Retinoic acid early transcript 1G (RAET1G) is a cell surface glycoprotein encoded by RAET1G gene located on the chromosome 6. RAET1G is related to MHC class I molecules, but its gene maps outside the MHC locus. RAET1G is composed of external α1α2 domain, transmembrane segment and C-terminal cytoplasmic tail. RAET1E functions as a stress-induced ligand for NKG2D receptor.

References

Glycoproteins